Mimí Ardú (born 28 February 1956, Río Cuarto, Cordoba) is an Argentinian actress and former vedette.

Career 
At age 15, Ardú began receiving piano lessons from a piano teacher. That same year, she obtained her first job in the Entry Institute of Philosophy and Language as an administrator and helping primary school students. She finished her secondary studies at the Liceo Nacional de Señoritas Nro. 12 de Caballito. She studied dancing with Noemí Coelho and acting with Carlos Gandolfo in Argentina and León Escobar in Mexico. She sang with Mabel Moreno in Argentina and with David Soule Zendejas in Mexico. During the summer of 1979, she performed in Mar del Plata, where she was very successful. This led to her Reina Reech in the comedy Enredos de alcoba at the Mar del Plata Provincial Theatre. Since then, she has been continuously performing in theatre and television, forming part of the cast of telenovelas and other popular programs.

She was initiated by her sculptural body as the second vedette of several theatrical magazines to later become an actress of dramatic character.

Filmography

TV

 Scandal in the Family (1967)
 Ladies' Photographer (1978)
 Las Muñecas Que Hacen ¡PUM! (1979): Mimi Ardou
 Comandos azules en acción (1980)
 Sucedió en el internado (1985)
 Seguridad personal (1986)
 Antonella (1992): Raquel Cornejo Mejía
 El bonaerense (2002): Mabel
 Vereda tropical (2004): Kari Kerr
 A Year Without Love (2005): Auntie
 Lo bueno de los otros (2005): Doctora
 La demolición (2005)
 Paredón, paredón (2005)
 Mujeres asesinas (2006): Ana
 Patito Feo (2008): Susana
 The Man Who Came to a Village (2006): María
 Contra Las Cuerdas (2010): Beba
 Dulce amor (2013): Ofelia Molina
 Somos familia (2014): Elsa

TV-series

 La Chona superstar (1983, 3 episodes)
 Entre el amor y el poder (1984, 25 episodes): Pia Maru
 Buscavidas (1984, 19 episodes)
 Pelear por la vida (1984)
 Antonella (1991, 191 episodes): Raquel Cornejo Mejía
 Casi todo, casi nada (1993, 29 episodes)
 Pretty Face (1994, 130 episodes)
 Son de diez (1992-1995, 145 episodes)
 Señoras y señores (1997, 19 episodes)
 De corazón (1997-1998, 396 episodes)
 Endless Summer (1998)
 Hospital público (2003, 19 episodes): Marikena Volpe 
 Los pensionados (2004, 115 episodes)
 Los machos de América (2004, 19 episodes)
 Cold Blood (2004, TV Mini Series, 6 episodes): Marga
 Se dice amor (2005, 254 episodes): Elena Suárez 
 Conflictos en red (2005, (TV Mini Series, 1 episode): Mamá de Sebastián
 Killer Women (2006, 1 episode): Ana
 El pasado (2007)
 Two Friends and a Burglar (2008)
 ¡Me robaron el papel picado! (2009)
 Franzie (2010)
 Hermanitos del fin del mundo (2011): Profesora Perkins
 The Clairvoyant's Prayer (2012): Dra. Kessler
 Derecho de piso (2014):  Madre de Daniela
 La Salada (2014): Woman of the bar
 Libre de sospecha (2015)
 Angelita la doctora (2016)
 Hojas verdes de Otoño (2018): Carmen
 Secretos de amor (2010, 68 episodes): Tere
 Contra las cuerdas (2010, 5 episodes): Beba
 Candy Love (2012, 19 episodes)
 La celebración (2014, TV Mini Series, 1 episode)

Cinema 
 Las muñecas que hacen ¡pum! (1979)
 Comandos azules en acción (1980)
 El Bonaerense (2002): Mabel
 A Year Without Love (2004): Tía

Theatre 
 Soñar en Boedo (2009; 2010)
 The House of Bernarda Alba (2013–2016)

More 

 Un culebrón mejicano (2003, TV Movie)
 La profesora (2005, short film): The Professor
 Mujeres elefante (2007, TV Movie)

Awards

References

External links 
 

1956 births
Living people
People from Río Cuarto, Córdoba
Argentine vedettes
Argentine film actresses
Argentine stage actresses
Argentine television actresses